The 1943 All-Pro Team consisted of American football players who were chosen by various selectors for the All-Pro team for the 1943 football season. Teams were selected by, among others, the Associated Press (AP), the United Press (UP), the International News Service (INS), Pro Football Illustrated, the New York Daily News (NYDN), and the Chicago Herald-American (CHA).

Selections

References

All-Pro Teams
1943 National Football League season